Amira Griselda Gómez Tueme (born 21 August 1954) is a Mexican politician affiliated with the PRI. She currently serves as Deputy of the LXII Legislature of the Mexican Congress representing Monterrey. She also served as Senator during the LX and LXI Legislatures.

References

1954 births
Living people
Politicians from Monterrey
Women members of the Senate of the Republic (Mexico)
Members of the Senate of the Republic (Mexico)
Members of the Chamber of Deputies (Mexico)
Institutional Revolutionary Party politicians
20th-century Mexican politicians
20th-century Mexican women politicians
21st-century Mexican politicians
21st-century Mexican women politicians
Women members of the Chamber of Deputies (Mexico)
University of Monterrey alumni
Members of the Congress of Tamaulipas